The Wych Elm cultivar Ulmus glabra 'Firma' was described by Schneider in 1904.

Description
The tree was described as having leaves like the species but firmer in texture.

Cultivation
No specimens are known to survive.

References

External links
  Sheet described as Ulmus glabra Huds. f. firma Schneid.

Wych elm cultivar
Ulmus articles missing images
Ulmus
Missing elm cultivars